After the Show is a 1921 American silent drama film directed by William C. deMille and written by Vianna Knowlton and Hazel Christie MacDonald based on a story by Rita Weiman. The film stars Jack Holt, Lila Lee, Charles Stanton Ogle, Eve Southern, Shannon Day, and Carlton S. King. The film was released on October 9, 1921, by Paramount Pictures. It is not known whether the film currently survives, and it may be a lost film.

Plot
As described in a film magazine, country girl Eileen (Lee) comes to New York City to make her career on the stage. She is rescued from want by Pop O'Malley (Ogle), an aged actor who works as a door keeper, and finds employment in the chorus. Larry Taylor (Holt), a wealthy man-about-town, seeks to win her without benefit of clergy. She falls in love with him and, against Pop's instructions, goes to his house. Knowing what awaits her there, Pop follows her with a resulting dramatic ending.

Cast 
Jack Holt as Larry Taylor
Lila Lee as Eileen
Charles Stanton Ogle as Pop O'Malley
Eve Southern as Naomi Stokes
Shannon Day as Lucy
Carlton S. King as Mr. McGuire
Stella Seager as Vera
Ethel Wales as Landlady
William Boyd (uncredited)

References

External links 

1921 films
1920s English-language films
Silent American drama films
1921 drama films
Paramount Pictures films
Films directed by William C. deMille
American black-and-white films
American silent feature films
1920s American films